Laval Graf Nugent von Westmeath (3 November 1777 – 21 August 1862) was a soldier of Irish birth, who fought in the armies of Austria and the Two Sicilies.

Biography
Born at Ballynacor, Ireland, Nugent was the son of Count Michael Anton Nugent von Westmeath, Governor of Prague.

In 1793, he joined the Austrian Army, becoming Colonel in 1807, and Chief of Staff of the Army corps of Archduke Johann of Austria in 1809.  In 1813, he led the campaign against Viceroy Eugène de Beauharnais, separating French units in Dalmatia and simultaneously joining the British fleet, thus conquering Croatia, Istria and the Po valley. In 1815, during the Neapolitan War, he commanded the right wing of the Austrian Army in Italy, liberated Rome, and defeated Joachim Murat at the Battle of Ceprano and the Battle of San Germano.

In 1816, Nugent was given the title of prince by Pope Pius VII. In 1817, he entered the service of King Ferdinand I of the Two Sicilies. He married Countess Giovannina Riario-Sforza who owned property in the small town of Montepeloso (Irsina), in Basilicata. After the outbreak of the Carbonari rebellion in 1820, he returned to serve in the Austrian Army. In 1848, he led an Army Corps under Joseph Radetzky von Radetz against the Piedmontese, in the course of the First Italian War of Independence, and also against the Hungarian Revolution of 1848.  He received the title of Field Marshal in 1849.

Nugent died on 22 August 1862 in the Bosiljevo Castle, near Karlovac, and his body was later transferred to a sarcophagus in the Doric temple "Peace for the Hero", in Trsat above Rijeka, next to the sarcophagus of his wife.

See also
 Irish military diaspora
 Irish regiments

Sources
Laval, Graf Nugent von Westmeath. In Meyers Konversations-Lexikon. 5. Auflage, 1896.
Nugent, Laval Graf von. In ADB. Band 24. Duncker & Humblodt, Leipzig 1875-1912. Online: 
Nugent-Westmeath, Laval Graf. In Constantin von Wurzbach, Biographisches Lexikon des Kaiserthums Oesterreich. 20. Band. Wien 1869. Online:

References

Field marshals of Austria
Irish emigrants to Austria
1777 births
1862 deaths
18th-century Irish people
19th-century Irish people
People from County Westmeath
Knights of the Golden Fleece of Austria
Commanders Cross of the Military Order of Maria Theresa
Honorary Knights Commander of the Order of the Bath
Knights Grand Cross of the Order of Saints Maurice and Lazarus
Irish soldiers in the Austrian Army
People of the First Italian War of Independence
Wild Geese (soldiers)